April Fool's Day is a 1993 book by Australian author Bryce Courtenay. The book is a tribute to the author's son, Damon Courtenay, a haemophiliac who contracted HIV/AIDS through an infected blood transfusion. The title refers to the date of Damon's death, 1 April 1991 (April Fools' Day).

Damon was a classic haemophiliac all his life. He attempted to write this book himself but did not have much success. On his death bed, he asked his father to write it for him. Damon talked a lot about love; he believed it was important that everybody knew how to love. Evidence of this is his attitude towards people who treated people with AIDS unfairly. Not much was known about AIDS back then and sufferers were frowned upon. To quote his devoted partner Celeste, "Love is an energy, it cannot be created nor destroyed. It simply is. Giving meaning to life and direction to goodness."

Sources
Bryce Courtenay's official webpage

1993 Australian novels
Novels by Bryce Courtenay
Novels about HIV/AIDS
Random House books